Amorphophallus bulbifer is a species of subtropical tuberous herbaceous plant found in Assam; Bangladesh; China South-Central; East Himalaya; India; Myanmar; Nepal.

References

External links
 
 

bulbifer